Clanculus escondidus is a species of sea snail, a marine gastropod mollusk in the family Trochidae, the top snails.

Description
The height of the shell attains 8 mm.

Distribution
This marine species occurs off the Philippines.

References

 Poppe G.T., Tagaro S.P. & Vilvens C. (2009) A new Clanculus (Trochidae) from the Philippines, with additional notes and new records of Trichidae-species in the archipelago. Visaya 2(4): 4-10.

External links
 

escondidus
Gastropods described in 2009